Jupiter Temple is a -elevation summit located in the Grand Canyon, in Coconino County of northern Arizona, United States.

Jupiter Temple is named for Jupiter, supreme deity in Roman mythology, in keeping with Clarence Dutton's tradition of naming geographical features in the Grand Canyon after mythological deities. This feature's name was officially adopted in 1906 by the U.S. Board on Geographic Names. According to the Köppen climate classification system, Jupiter Temple is located in a cold semi-arid climate zone.

Geology

The summit of Jupiter Temple is a cupola of remnant Permian Coconino Sandstone overlaying strata of the Pennsylvanian-Permian Supai Group. This in turn overlays the cliff-forming layer of Mississippian Redwall Limestone, which in turn overlays Cambrian Tonto Group, and finally Neoproterozoic Chuar Group at river level. Precipitation runoff from Jupiter Temple drains south to the Colorado River via Basalt and Unkar Creeks.

See also
 Geology of the Grand Canyon area

Gallery

References

External links 

 Weather forecast: National Weather Service

Grand Canyon
Landforms of Coconino County, Arizona
Mountains of Arizona
Mountains of Coconino County, Arizona
Colorado Plateau
Grand Canyon National Park
North American 2000 m summits